Grammatics is the debut full-length studio album by UK indie rock band Grammatics, released in the United Kingdom on 24 March 2009.

The album's last track, "Swan Song," is approximately 6 minutes, and after a few minutes of silence, a 1½ minute hidden track enters.

Reception
The album has a score of 73 on Metacritic

Track listing
 "Shadow Committee" – 5:10
 "D.I.L.E.M.M.A." – 4:29
 "Murderer" – 4:59
 "The Vague Archive" – 3:55
 "Broken Wing" – 4:58
 "Relentless Fours" – 6:38
 "Inkjet Lakes" – 4:37
 "Polar Swelling" – 6:39
 "Rosa Flood" – 3:31
 "Cruel Tricks of the Light" – 4:02
 "Swan Song" – 12:31

The track listing according to the 12" version lists an additional track, "Time Capsules & The Greater Truth",  having the hidden track play after this.

References

Grammatics albums
2009 albums